Neville Gosson (1927-2016) was an Australian professional rugby league footballer who played in the 1950s.

A hooker, Gosson was a St. George junior, who was elevated to first grade for the 1951 season. The arrival of Ken Kearney to St George in 1952 ended his career at the club, although he continued his career at Canowindra Rugby League Club as a contracted player-coach for the 1952 season. He returned to Sydney and joined   Eastern Suburbs, and played a full season in first grade with them in 1955 before retiring from rugby league. 

Gosson later found fame as a round-the-world yachtsman. He died in 2016.

References

St. George Dragons players
Australian rugby league players
Sydney Roosters players
1927 births
Rugby league hookers
2016 deaths